San Javier is a Chilean city and commune located in the Province of Linares, Maule Region. The Pan-American Highway ("Ruta 5 Sur") passes through the commune of San Javier, touching tangentially the eastern side of the town. A paved road connects San Javier with Colbún, Colbún dam lake and Panimávida and Quinamávida hot springs.

Demography
According to 2005 estimates, the commune of San Javier has a population of 39,583, of which 19,682 are male and 19,901 are female. About 60% of the population is urban and 40% is rural. According to the 2002 census of the National Statistics Institute, the population of the commune of San Javier was 37,793 inhabitants (18,827 men and 18,966 women). Of these, 22,004 (58.2%) lived in urban areas and 15,789 (41.8%) in rural areas. Between the 1992 and 2002 censuses, the population grew by 6.2% (2,206 persons).

Geography
The eastern (and smaller) part of its territory lies within the fertile, central plain or "depresión intermedia", (Chilean Central Valley) but the extense western part is hilly and somewhat drier, a typical "Cordillera de la Costa" terrain, which requires supplemental irrigation to support its varied cultivations. This area lends itself nicely to wine growing and cereal cultivation. Therefore, San Javier has some of the better vineyards and quality wines of the bountiful Maule Valley, in the Chile's central valley viticultural regions or appellations.

San Javier is bordered on the west by the communes of Constitución and Empedrado, (both in Talca province), Cauquenes, (in Cauquenes Province), and Villa Alegre; on the north by Pencahue and Maule communes, in Talca province; on the east, by Yerbas Buenas, Villa Alegre, Linares and Longaví and on the south, by Cauquenes and Retiro. The town lies on the right margin of the River Loncomilla. Located a few km north of San Javier is the wide Maule river, of which the Loncomilla is the main tributary. River Purapel, a regional "anomaly", since it flows eastward in a country where the overwhelming majority of rivers flow in the opposite direction, is a tributary of the Loncomilla.

Geographic coordinates
 Elevation: 
 Latitude: 35° 36' 0S
 Longitude: 71° 42' 0W

Heritage

Architecture

There are many villages and other smaller, rural entities within the communal territory; several of them are quite distant from the main urban centers and relatively isolated from the more distorting external cultural influences. Therefore, the commune can boast several villages with well-preserved colonial rural architecture - the criollo legacy - both in the religious as well as the civil domains. Singular examples of this brand of picturesque and  bucolic villages, in the commune, are: Huerta de Maule, Nirivilo, Bobadilla, Caliboro and Melozal. Also, along the paved road that connects the towns of San Javier and Villa Alegre there are some outstanding examples of traditional Chilean rural architecture, which is especially noticeable in the farm houses (casas de fundo) typical of the region.

Some of the parish churches in this zone are among the oldest in the Linares diocese and the Maule Region.

Poets
The Maule Region has produced a remarkable number of writers and poets and in consonancy with this legacy, San Javier has been the birthplace of two gifted poets: Raimundo Echeverría y Larrazábal (1897–1924) and Jerónimo Lagos Lisboa (1883–1958).

Administration
As a commune, San Javier is a third-level administrative division of Chile administered by a municipal council, headed by an alcalde who is directly elected every four years. The 2008-2012 alcalde is Pedro Fernández Chavarrí (PDC), and the councillors are as follows:
 José Zapata Mora: UDI
 Maria Yolanda Lopez Balduzzi: RN
 Jorge Ignacio Silva Sepúlveda: PDC
 Gabriel Rodriguez Bustos: PPD
 Ronaldo Abraham Flores: PPD
 Cristobal Cancino Albornoz: UDI

Within the electoral divisions of Chile, San Javier is represented in the Chamber of Deputies by Jorge Tarud (PDC) and Romilio Gutiérrez (UDI) as part of the 39th electoral district, together with Linares, Colbún, Villa Alegre, Yerbas Buenas. The commune is represented in the Senate by Hernán Larraín (UDI) and Manuel Antonio Matta (PDC) as part of the 11th senatorial constituency (Maule-South).

References

External links
  Municipality of San Javier
  Aerial view of San Javier, Chile with the Loncomilla river to the west and the confluence of the latter and the Maule river, to the north (Google maps)

Populated places in Linares Province
Communes of Chile
Populated places established in 1852
1852 establishments in Chile